Sadeq Ardeshir Larijani (born 12 March 1961), better known as Amoli Larijani, is an Iranian scholar, conservative politician, and current chairman of Expediency Discernment Council. He is the former and fifth Chief Justice of the judicial system of Iran after the 1979 revolution.

Early life and education
He was born in 1339 solar (1961) in Najaf, to Iranian parents. His father, Ayatollah Mirza Hashem Amoli, was an eminent Mujtahid of his time who worked in Najaf after being exiled by Mohammad Reza Shah. The family moved to Iran after the Iranian Revolution in 1979. Larijani became familiar with both religious sciences and modern sciences as child. He began his primary school in 1345 solar (1966) and finished high school in 1356 solar (1977). Following high school, he began his seminary studies in Qom. He finished his seminary studies in 1368 solar (1989) then began to teach in both seminary and university. He became a member of scientific staffs of Qom University and taught many courses in theology and comparative philosophy. Larijani is a brother of Ali Larijani (Speaker of the previo Majlis), Mohammad Javad Larijani, Bagher Larijani (Chancellor of Tehran University of Medical Sciences), and Fazel Larijani (Iran's former cultural attachée in Ottawa).

Career
Larijani served as one of the 12 members of the Guardian Council of the Islamic Republic of Iran for eight years. Described as "relatively junior" or "inexperienced cleric" with "close ties to Iran's military and intelligence agencies", he was appointed head of the judicial system of Iran by supreme leader Ali Khamenei on 14 August 2009.

According to leading Iranian human rights defense lawyer Mohammad Seifzadeh, the head of the Judicial System of Iran is required to be a Mojtahed with significant experience in the field. Larijani, however, was neither an experienced jurist nor a highly ranked cleric and carried the title of Hojjat-ol Eslam up to a few months before his appointment to the post. Larijani's tenure as the Chief Justice of Iran ended on 7 March 2019, when the Supreme Leader Ali Khamenei appointed Ebrahim Raisi to succeed him.

Activities
Shortly after his appointment, Larijani appointed Saeed Mortazavi to the post of deputy prosecutor general of Iran. Mortazavi was prosecutor general of Tehran for more than seven years during which he was involved in murdering and torturing a number of Iranian civilians and activists. One of the high-profile deaths attributed to Mortazavi is that of Canadian-Iranian photojournalist Zahra Kazemi. On 7 September 2009, Iranian police with permission from judiciary system and Tehran General Court entered the office for support of political prisoners and seized all the documents, computers among others. The police refused to give a receipt of the items. The office was organized by Mehdi Karroubi and Mir Hossein Mousavi for supporting the victims of torture in Iranian prisons. On 8 September 2009, Iranian Judiciary, unexpectedly closed and sealed the office of National Confidence Party and arrested Morteza Alviri and Alireza Beheshti and several of the closest allies of opposition leaders Mehdi Karroubi and Mir Hossein Mousavi. That same month, the authorities from the Judiciary System began targeting the children of leaders of the opposition groups. For instance, Atefeh Emam, the daughter of jailed activist Javad Emam, the Chief of Staff of Mousavi's campaign, was arrested on 9 September 2009, held in a secret facility and tortured to pressure her to make a "confession" implicating her father. The Judiciary released her after twenty-four hours in the South of Tehran in an inappropriate condition.

Controversies

In 2015, he said it is illegal for the Assembly of Experts to supervise Supreme Leader Ali Khamenei. In 2016, he warned president Hassan Rouhani against voicing opposition to Supreme Leader Ali Khamenei.

Views
Sadegh Larijani stated that the government does not derive its legitimacy from the votes of the nation. He is a well-known critic of ex-president Mohammad Khatami and his reforms. In March 1998, an article by him attacking Khatami's call for a civil Islamic society and Abdolkarim Soroush's philosophy was published in Sobh newspaper.

Larijani proclaimed: 
"We support a society which is based on the spirit of Islam and religious faith, in which Islamic and religious values are propagated, in which every Koranic injunction and the teachings of the Prophet of Islam and the Imams are implemented. It will be a society in which the feeling of servitude to God Almighty will be manifest everywhere, and in which people will not demand their rights from God but are conscious of their obligations to God."

At the same time, he considered as leading figure in the sphere of philosophy of law or fiqh.
He also criticizes the views of people – such as Abdolkarim Soroush – who says that while there is a society, or civilization, of Muslims, there is no such thing as an Islamic society or civilization, and that Islam is a spiritual and individual way of life, not an ideology.
Larijani condemned protesters and those who expressed doubts in the 2009 presidential election results, calling the protests "illegal" and any doubts "baseless".

Sanctions
On 23 May 2012, Larijani was put into the sanction list of the European Union, which was published in the Official Journal of the Union. In the journal, it was stated that as head of the judiciary in Iran, he endorsed and allowed harsh punishments for retribution crimes, crimes against God, and crimes against the state.

In January 2018, the United States sanctioned Larijani for human rights abuses, which Iran strongly denied.

Works
Ayatollah Sadeq Larijani wrote works in a variety of different fields such as Islamic jurisprudence (fiqh), principles of Islamic jurisprudence (Uṣūl al-fiqh), analytic philosophy, philosophy of language, and moral philosophy. He also translated some works into Persian, notably Geoffrey Warnock's Contemporary Moral Philosophy. He also translated a philosophy of science article by Karl Popper. In a number of works he criticises the western point of view from an Islamic viewpoint. In May 2016, The collection of philosophy of principles was represented by him. This collection amounts to 33 volumes and until now just the first and the fifth volume have been published.

Some of the books written by him are as follows:
Critics on Theory of Theoretical Limitation and Expansion of Shariah
Analytical Philosophy, Designation and Necessity
Theories of Meaning

Public image
According to a poll conducted in March 2016 by Information and Public Opinion Solutions LLC (iPOS) among Iranian citizens, Larijani has 37% approval and 29% disapproval ratings and thus a +8% net popularity; while 23% of responders don't recognize the name.

Personal life
Larijani is son-in-law of Grand Ayatollah Hossein Vahid Khorasani, who was one of his teachers in Qom.

References

1961 births
Living people
Iranian expatriates in Iraq
People from Najaf
Combatant Clergy Association politicians
21st-century Iranian judges
Members of the Assembly of Experts
People from Amol
Chief justices of Iran
Members of the Guardian Council
Society of Seminary Teachers of Qom members
Iranian individuals subject to the U.S. Department of the Treasury sanctions